Bertram Willes Dayrell Brooke, Tuan Muda of Sarawak (8 August 1876 – 15 September 1965), was the last heir apparent to the Raj of Sarawak and a member of the family of White Rajahs.

Life
Brooke was the son of Charles, the second of these rajahs, and a brother of Vyner of Sarawak, the third and final ruler of that family. He was for some years heir presumptive to his brother, a claim he relinquished in favour of his son. He held the title of "Tuan Muda" (literally "Young Lord") and the style of "His Highness".

Brooke was educated at Winchester College and at Trinity College, Cambridge. He was president of Cambridge University Boat Club and rowed in the Boat Race in 1900 and 1901, and he was a member of the Pitt Club. He went on to serve in the Royal Horse Artillery during the First World War and act as Special Commissioner from Sarawak to the UK.

Brooke married Gladys Milton Palmer on 28 June 1904. She was the only child of Sir Walter Palmer, 1st Baronet. As wife of the Tuan Muda, Gladys took the title of "Dayang Muda" and the style of "Her Highness". The couple had one son, Anthony, titular Rajah Muda of Sarawak, and three daughters.

See also
List of Cambridge University Boat Race crews

References

1876 births
1965 deaths
Alumni of Trinity College, Cambridge
British Army personnel of World War I
British male rowers
Cambridge University Boat Club rowers
People educated at Winchester College
People from Kuching
Bertram Brooke